Fayza Hidar Elnady Rahim (born 12 February 1984) is an Egyptian footballer who plays as a midfielder. She has been a member of the Egypt women's national team.

Club career
Rahim has played for Tayaran in Egypt.

International career
Rahim capped for Egypt at senior level during the 2016 Africa Women Cup of Nations.

Coaching career

On 11 August 2021, Rahim is currently the coach of Goldi SC, becoming the first Egyptian woman to coach a men's club team.

References

1984 births
Living people
Egyptian women's footballers
Women's association football midfielders
Egypt women's international footballers